Arjun Roy (born 2 May 1972) is an Indian politician. He was a member of the Indian Parliament, and represented Sitamarhi (Lok Sabha constituency).

References

1972 births
Living people
India MPs 2009–2014
Lok Sabha members from Bihar
Janata Dal (United) politicians
Babasaheb Bhimrao Ambedkar Bihar University alumni
Bihar MLAs 2005–2010
Rashtriya Janata Dal politicians